Fishamble Street is a street in Dublin, Ireland within the old city walls.

Location 
The street joins Wood Quay at the Fish Slip near Fyan's Castle. It originally ran from Castle Street to Essex Quay until the creation of Lord Edward Street in 1886.

History 
It is mentioned in the 14th century as Vicus Piscariorum, Viscus Piscariæ, and as Fish Street. In 1577, Stanihurst named it St John's Street. In the fifteenth century, it was referred to as "the Fishamyls".  John Estrete, the eminent judge and statesman, owned a house here in 1483. In 1610, some editions of Speed's map call it Fish Shambles. During the 1950s it was for a time officially considered part of Moore Street, though in practice it retained its separate identity.

The street was known as the official fish market for Dublin until the end of the 17th century when the city markets were moved to the north bank of the Liffey. ("Shambles" were meat markets and open-air slaughterhouse districts, and the word occurs in several British and Irish street names, such as The Shambles in York.)

From 1680, around about the time the fish market was moved, the General Post Office was located here and remained for 30 years. The Church of St. John the Evangelist was located here until it was demolished in the 1880s.

Fishamble Street was the birthplace of both Henry Grattan, Irish politician and lawyer, and James Clarence Mangan, a 19th-century poet.

Taverns

In the 18th century, a tavern on the street, the Bull's Head, was one of the most popular and well-known establishments in Dublin, and was in demand for anniversary and celebratory dinners by the various city guilds and bodies. It also provided accommodation for assemblies of the Grand Lodge of Irish Freemasons. The Bull's Head Musical Society was also well known and undertook the building of a Musick Hall which was formally opened in 1741.

The street is famous as the site of the first performance of Handel's Messiah, which took place in the aforementioned Music Hall on 13 April 1742 before a large audience. Daniel O'Connell addressed an audience in the theatre on 28 February 1812. A pub further up on Thomas Street was known as G. F. Handel's before changing its name to Arthur's.

Fishamble Street is also home to Darkey Kelly's, a well-known Dublin music pub. It was named after Dorcas Kelly, who ran a popular brothel in the street in the 1750s and was executed for murder in 1761.

See also

List of streets and squares in Dublin

References

Streets in Dublin (city)